Fokino is a closed town in Primorsky Krai, Russia, located on the coast of the Peter the Great Gulf, on the Abrek Bay, about  south of Vladivostok, the administrative center of the krai. Population:  

It was previously known as Tikhookeansky (until 1980), Shkotovo-17 (until 1994).

History
The village of Promyslovka was founded on the current site of Fokino in 1891. Promyslovka was granted urban-type settlement status in 1958, and the nearby naval village of Tikhookeansky followed suit in 1963. The settlements grew together, were merged, and were granted town status on October 4, 1980. However, due to its status as a base for the Russian Pacific Fleet, the town was closed, and referred to officially under the code name Shkotovo-17. Since 1994, Fokino has been the official name of the town.

After the APEC-2012 Summit was held in Vladivostok, Fokino will become the main naval base at the Russian Far East, where the Russian Pacific Fleet will be attached.

Administrative and municipal status
Within the framework of administrative divisions, it is, together with two urban-type settlements (Dunay and Putyatin), incorporated as Fokino Town Under Krai Jurisdiction—an administrative unit with the status equal to that of the districts. As a municipal division, Fokino Town Under Krai Jurisdiction is incorporated as Fokino Urban Okrug.

Tourism
It is a closed town because the Russian Pacific Fleet is based there. Foreigners must have a special permit to visit the town. However, the Islands of Putyatin and Askold, which are a part of the territory administered by the town, are open for visits by tourists. Up to two thousand tourists visit Putyatin every year. They are attracted by the unique flora and fauna in the waters surrounding this island and its underwater landscape. Approximately 2,400 people inhabit Putyatin Island. Their main occupation is catching and processing sea products, breeding mink and spotted deer.

There is no permanent population on Askold. It is rarely visited by tourists because of the absence of regular transport connections with the mainland, and the status of the island which until 1995 had formed part of the Reserve where no economic activity was allowed. There are deposits of gold estimated at dozens of tonnes on Askold.

Climate

References

Notes

Sources

External links

Official website of Fokino 
Fokino Business Directory 

Cities and towns in Primorsky Krai
Closed cities
Russian and Soviet Navy bases